Pieter Stuurman (born 23 May 1981) is a South African first class cricketer. He was included in the South Western Districts cricket team squad for the 2015 Africa T20 Cup.

References

External links
 

1981 births
Living people
South African cricketers
South Western Districts cricketers